Marjorie Velázquez (born August 11, 1981) is an American politician from New York City. A Democrat, Velázquez is currently a member of the New York City Council representing the 13th district, which covers parts of the eastern Bronx.

Early life
Velázquez was born in the Bronx to Puerto Rican parents who had moved to New York City in the 1970s. She graduated from St. Catharine Academy and received her B.A. in finance and accounting from the New York University Stern School of Business.

Political career

Pre-Council career
After working for several years in accounting and corporate finance, Velázquez suffered serious injures in a 2012 car accident. She joined Bronx Community Board 10 and was elected as a Democratic District Leader for the 82nd Assembly district, a position she still holds.

2017 City Council campaign
In 2017, Velázquez ran to succeed term-limited Democrat James Vacca in the 13th district of the New York City Council. With support from Vacca and The New York Times, among others, Velázquez was seen as one of the race's frontrunners.

Velázquez's main opponent in the Democratic primary was Assemblyman Mark Gjonaj, who ran to Velázquez's right and spent over $700,000, a record for a City Council campaign. Velázquez lost the primary by a 38-34% margin, with three other candidates taking the remainder. Soon after, Velázquez indicated she would be back, saying, "Would I ever run again? Most definitely."

2021 City Council campaign
Velázquez announced in 2020 that she would seek a 2021 rematch with Gjonaj, citing the repeated scandals Gjonaj found himself combating during his first term. In February 2021, however, Gjonaj announced he would not seek re-election, saying that the political climate was "not favorable to a centrist ideology that my constituency, community and I embrace."

Now running for an open seat, Velázquez would go on to win the five-way Democratic primary in June 2021. She won the subsequent November 2021 general election with a near-identical 56.3% of the vote and took office in January 2022.

City Council 
In 2022, Velázquez protested against turning an unused building on Jacobi Medical Center’s campus into housing for ex-convicts with complex medical needs (such as Stage 4 cancer or congestive heart failure).
Constituents say the Bronx is overwhelmed with these types of facilities (group homes, homeless shelters, etc.) and that they should be spread more evenly throughout the 5 boroughs.
 That same year, she also opposed the large scale construction of 339 housing units (only 94 of which were income restricted) in a small residential neighborhood of Throggs Neck. The proposal was considered by many to be an example of “upzoning,” the changing of local laws to allow for denser future development.

Personal life
Velázquez lives in Throggs Neck with her husband and their three cats.

References

Living people
1981 births
Politicians from the Bronx
New York University Stern School of Business alumni
New York (state) Democrats
American politicians of Puerto Rican descent
Puerto Rican people in New York (state) politics
Hispanic and Latino American politicians
Hispanic and Latino American women in politics
21st-century American women politicians
21st-century American politicians
Women New York City Council members
New York City Council members